USS Manning may refer to the following ships:

 , was commissioned 8 January 1898 and decommissioned 22 May 1930
 , was launched 1 June 1943 and decommissioned 15 January 1947

United States Navy ship names